The following is the qualification system and list of qualified nations for the table tennis at the 2023 Pan American Games competition.

Qualification system
A total of 88 athletes will qualify to compete (44 men and 44 women). Each nation may enter a maximum of 6 athletes (three per gender). In each gender there will be a total of 12 teams qualified, with one team per event reserved for the host nation Chile. Six places will be allocated for singles events (by gender) to athletes that have obtained the best results at the qualification tournament for singles events of the Pan American Games. Athletes qualified through various qualifying events.

The top two teams (for men and women) at the 2022 Pan American Championships, the top two teams (not already qualified) from the Caribbean, Central America, South America and the top team from North America, and the two best teams from the Special qualification event will each qualify a team. As stated earlier, Chile also qualified a team in each event. The last 6 spots will be awarded to individuals, with a maximum of two per nation.

Qualification timeline

Qualification summary

Men

Women

References

Pan American Games Qualification
Qualification for the 2023 Pan American Games